Tumua Manu (born 18 April 1993) is a Samoan rugby union player who plays for the  in the Super Rugby competition. His position of choice is centre and Wing.

Manu decided to try his chances in New Zealand Rugby in 2015. He played for College Rifles that year but at the end of the season he suffered an ACL injury and spent most of 2016 on the sideline in rehabilitation. He returned to play for the club in 2017 and impressed sufficiently to get a call-up to the Auckland side in the Mitre 10 Cup. Injuries to Sonny Bill Williams and Tamati Tua gave him an opportunity to play for the Blues in Super Rugby 2018 where he scored 3 tries in 4 matches.

References 

New Zealand rugby union players
1993 births
Living people
Samoan emigrants to New Zealand
Auckland rugby union players
Blues (Super Rugby) players
Chiefs (rugby union) players
Samoan rugby union players
Rugby union centres
Rugby union wings
Section Paloise players